Telliyavaram Mahadevan Ponnambalam Mahadevan (24 August 1911 – 5 November 1983) was an Indian writer, philosopher, and Advaita scholar. He was a professor of philosophy at the University of Madras. His doctoral thesis was titled "The Philosophy of Advaita".

References 

1911 births
1983 deaths
20th-century Indian philosophers
Tamil scholars
Academic staff of the University of Madras
Recipients of the Padma Bhushan in literature & education